Jarosław Popiela (born 17 May 1974) is a Polish former professional footballer who played as a defender.

Career
Born in Tarnów, Popiela played for Unia Tarnów, Petrochemia Płock, KSZO Ostrowiec Świętokrzyski, Orlen Płock, Zagłębie Lubin, Górnik Zabrze, APOEL, Ethnikos Piraeus, Fostiras, P.A.S. Korinthos and Grom Lipowo.

Personal life
He is the brother of Łukasz Popiela and father of Krystian Popiela.

References

1974 births
Living people
Polish footballers
Unia Tarnów players
Wisła Płock players
KSZO Ostrowiec Świętokrzyski players
Zagłębie Lubin players
Górnik Zabrze players
APOEL FC players
Ethnikos Piraeus F.C. players
Fostiras F.C. players
P.A.S. Korinthos players
Ekstraklasa players
Association football defenders
Polish expatriate footballers
Polish expatriates in Cyprus
Expatriate footballers in Cyprus
Polish expatriates in Greece
Expatriate footballers in Greece
Sportspeople from Tarnów